George Blair may refer to:
 George Blair (American football) (born 1938), American football halfback
 George Blair (director) (1905–1970), American film director
 George Blair (ice hockey) (1929–2010), Canadian professional hockey player
 G. W. Scott Blair (1902–1987), British chemist
 George A. Blair (1915–2013), American businessman, entrepreneur, and waterskier
 George W. Blair (1921–2020), American politician and rancher
 George Young Blair (1826–1894), Scottish marine engineer